Amigo Holdings is a guarantor loans / subprime lender.  It is listed on the London Stock Exchange.

History

The company was established as a mid-cost guarantor loans lender by James Benamor in 2005. Benamor stood down as CEO, handing over the role to Glen Crawford, in 2015. In June 2018 the company was the subject of an initial public offering on the London Stock Exchange which valued the company at £1.3 billion.

The company announced in July 2020 that it would be providing at least £35 million in order to address consumer complaints regarding lack of checks on affordability when taking out a loan. 

Amigo Holdings trading as Amigo Loans was involved in a case in Redhill County Court on 14 September 2016, when a Miss Abbas successfully defended a claim of circa £5,000 by Amigo Holdings on the basis that she never received a copy of the loan agreement.

On 1 June 2021, it was reported that Amigo faced possible bankruptcy after a High Court judge rejected an attempt by the company to cap payouts to customers.  Gary Jennison, Chief Executive Officer of Amigo, commented: "Without a scheme, Amigo faces insolvency as it will be unable to satisfy its customer compensation claims as well as meeting the legally binding funding obligations owed to its secured creditors."

Operations
The company is a business which issues mid-cost loans with payments guaranteed by a borrower's family or friends. The amount lent is up to £10,000, with a 49.9% APR, higher than loans from mainstream banks, but lower than high-cost products such as payday loans or rent-to-own. The company has secured around 88% of the guarantor loan market in the UK.

Ownership	
Approximately 61.4% of the company was owned by Richmond Group, a business controlled by James Benamor, the founder. Benamor sold his complete shareholding in June and July 2020 after failing to change the composition of the Board of Directors.

References

External links
Official site for consumers
Official site for investors
Financial services companies of the United Kingdom
Financial services companies established in 2005
Companies based in Bournemouth
Companies listed on the London Stock Exchange
British companies established in 2005